Fly by Night Theatre Company is an Irish theatre company based in Dublin. It was established in summer 1992, mostly by students from University College Dublin who had been active members of UCD Dramsoc, the student drama society. Regular members of the company were Richard Brennan, Jason Byrne, Kevin Hely, Peter McDonald, Conor McPherson, Colin O'Connor, and Valerie Spelman. The company was originally set up to produce new plays. Its first production was Radio Play (Concerning Communication) by Conor McPherson. The original cast included Brennan, Byrne, Hely, and McPherson, as well as Rebecca Bickerdike, Ciara Considine, and Coilín O Connor. McPherson also directed the production, which was performed from August 17–29, 1992 at the International Bar in Dublin.

The company went on to produce the following plays by McPherson:
 A Light in the Window of Industry (International Bar, August 3–21, 1993)
 Inventing Fortune's Wheel (Firkin Crane Theatre, Cork, March 3, 1994)
 The Light of Jesus (aka The Good Thief) (City Arts Centre, April 18–30, 1994)
 The Stars Lose Their Glory (International Bar, August 1–13, 1994)
 Rum and Vodka (City Arts Centre, September 1994)
 This Lime Tree Bower (jointly with Íomha Ildánach Theatre Company, Crypt Arts Centre, Dublin Castle, October 26, 1995; project@the mint and national tour, 1998)
and the following plays by Colin O'Connor:
 Van Gogh's Ear (International Bar, August 16, 1993)
 The Stranger (Player's Theatre, July 16, 1996)
 All Those Trammelling Dreams (Crypt Arts Centre, Dublin Castle, 1997)
 The Last Days of God (THEatre Space @ Henry Place, May 31 – June 17, 2000).

Though nominally a company, "Fly by Night" is really just an umbrella name under which a group of friends can make productions on their own terms. The company has not made any new performances since June 2000. Conor McPherson is an internationally renowned playwright, theatre director, film director, and sometime actor. Peter McDonald is a successful film and stage actor. Jason Byrne is a successful theatre director.

Theatre companies in the Republic of Ireland